The Chlopsidae, or false morays, are a family of eels found in coral reefs worldwide. As their name suggests, they somewhat resemble moray eels in appearance.

Genera
The family contains these genera:

Family Chlopsidae
 Genus Boehlkenchelys
 Genus Catesbya
 Genus Chilorhinus
 Genus Chlopsis
 Genus Kaupichthys
 Genus Powellichthys
 Genus Robinsia
 Genus Xenoconger

References

 
Marine fish families
Eels
Ray-finned fish families